Julijana Bizjak Mlakar is a former Slovenian politician. She served as Minister of Culture in the 12th Government of Slovenia from 18 September 2014 to 25 April 2016. Tone Peršak succeeded her as Minister of Culture.

References 

Living people
Year of birth missing (living people)
Place of birth missing (living people)
Women government ministers of Slovenia
Slovenian schoolteachers